Tácio Caetano Cruz Queiroz (born 7 August 1980), better known as just Tácio, is a former professional Brazilian footballer who played as defensive midfielder. In 1997, he was part of the Brazilian team that won the 1997 South American Under-17 Football Championship.

Biography

EC Vitória
Born in Valença, Bahia, Tácio started his career at Vitória. He played the 1998 1998 Copa do Brasil's edition and the Campeonato Baiano of that same season. In June 1998, he signed with A.C. Venezia along with Marcone and Bilica. He played once in 1998–99 Coppa Italia, a 1–1 draw with Juventus.

In January 1999, Tácio returned to Vitória, as his non-EU quota was transferred to newcomer Álvaro Recoba. Between 1999 and 2000, Tácio played 36 matches in Campeonato Brasileiro Série A and Copa João Havelange combined. He left the club in mid-2001, after playing the Campeonato Baiano and the Copa do Brasil of that season.

Brazil lower levels
Tácio signed with Paysandu in 2004, but left the club after two months. In December 2005, he joined Fluminense de Feira., where he remained until the end of the Campeonato Baiano of 2006. In October 2006, he signed a new contract with club, winning the Sergipe–Bahia Cup.

After the end of the Campeonato Baiano of 2007, Tácio joined Itabaiana, which won the Copa Governo do Estado de Sergipe. In July, Tácio signed with América (SE). The team failed to qualify to the second stage of the Campeonato Brasileiro's third division. In August, he left América to join Queimadense. The club won the Campeonato Paraibano's second division of 2007.

In February 2008, he returned to Itabaiana, finishing in the 4th position of the Campeonato Sergipano and getting to semi-finals of the Copa Governo do Estado de Sergipe. On 24 June 2006, Tácio signed with Joinville a -year contract, but immediately joined Grêmio Esportivo Juventus, on loan. The club finished as runner-up of the Campeonato Catarinense's second division.

In December 2008, Tácio returned to Fluminense de Feira, which finished the Campeonato Baiano's 2009's edition as semi-finalist. He scored two goals in the tournament. In July, he left the club to join Juazeirense, which finished as the runner-up of the Campeonato Baiano's second division. In August, he joined Sergipe. The club finished as the losing side of third stage of the Campeonato Brasileiro's fourth division (Série D) of 2009.

In October 2009, he signed with Paysandu. The team won the Campeonato Paraense of 2010 and got to the quarter-finals of the Campeonato Brasileiro's third division (Série C) of that season, when it was eliminated. In November 2010, Tácio signed once again with Fluminense de Feira.

Honours

International
Brazil U17
South American Under-17 Football Championship: 1997

National
Regional
Copa Sergipe–Bahia: 2006

State
Campeonato Paraense: 2010
Copa Governo do Estado de Sergipe: 2007
Copa da Bahia: 2006
Campeonato Paraibano – second division: 2007
Campeonato Catarinense – third division: 2013

References

External links
 CBF 
 Futpedia 
 

Brazilian footballers
Esporte Clube Vitória players
Venezia F.C. players
Fluminense de Feira Futebol Clube players
Club Sportivo Sergipe players
Paysandu Sport Club players
Esporte Clube Internacional de Lages players
Association football midfielders
Brazilian expatriate footballers
Brazilian expatriate sportspeople in Italy
Expatriate footballers in Italy
Sportspeople from Bahia
1980 births
Living people